William Chambers (by 1521–1559), of London, was an English politician.

He was a Member (MP) of the Parliament of England for St Ives in 1558.

References

1559 deaths
English MPs 1558
Politicians from London
Year of birth uncertain